Giving Children Hope (GCHope), founded in 1993 by John Ditty and Juliana Reasor, is a faith-based non-profit organization that works to alleviate poverty, both domestically and internationally, through disaster relief, health and community development, vocational training and advocacy. The organization is currently headed by Executive Director Sean Lawrence and the Chairman of the Board Bill Barta.

GCHope has delivered aid, set up medical clinics and micro-enterprises, all over the world including: South Africa, Cameroon, Ghana, Liberia, Zimbabwe, Malawi, Guatemala, Argentina, Peru, Indonesia, Russia, India, Bangladesh, Ukraine, Australia, Bosnia, Iraq, Pakistan, Lebanon, Tajikistan, Dominican Republic, Haiti and United States.  Giving Children Hope is involved in the reconstruction of many clinics in Iraq (see Reconstruction of Iraq).  Giving Children Hope is involved in serving homeless children in Orange County, California who have been identified as being chronically hungry through the provision of food.

In 2008, the organization was involved in the relief efforts of both the Cyclone Nargis in Burma and the Sichuan earthquake in China.  In November Giving Children Hope began shipping cholera medicines to Zimbabwe for the outbreak.  In 2009 Giving Children Hope equipped a clinic in Northern Thailand in partnership with Not For Sale for children rescued from human slavery.  The funding for the clinic was raised by the film, Call + Response.  In January 2010 Giving Children Hope began responding to the 2010 earthquake striking Haiti.

On January 5, 2015, the organization's website was hacked by the Team System Dz organization, which is an Islamic State group sympathizer.

References

External links 
Organization website
Myanmar frustrates Orange County aid agencies, The Orange County Register
Buena Park group sending help to cyclone victims, MSNBC
Following earthquake relief in Peru, setting up medical clinic in Zimbabwe, California charity partners with pastor to bring development to Cameroon, West Africa, ASSIST News Service (ANS)
From O.C. to Africa: Help on the way, The Orange County Register
Looking for a ride, The Orange County Register
Campus Food Drive Program Provides Weekend Meals for OC Children, California State University, Fullerton, Inside Magazine
Another team leaves Buena Park for Haiti, The Orange County Register
Giving Away Homes, The Orange County Register
Locals Takes On Global Causes, The Laguna Beach Independent
Haiti Earthquake Hits Home In O.C., The Orange County Register
Haiti Earthquake Aftermath: How To Help, Fox News
Chaparosa Grill plans Haiti fundraiser, The Orange County Register
Thousands use holiday to serve King, Daily Pilot
Former resident aids in Haiti relief efforts, The Porterville Recorder
Ashtel Dental and 7 Day Dental send toothbrushes to Haiti, Dental Tribune
Another Team Leaves Buena Park For Haiti, The Orange County Register
Disaster Relief For Haiti, Garden Grove TV3
Real Orange, Idaho Public Television
O.C. charities split between Chile, Haiti, The Orange County Register
The Real News- Local Community Gives to Haiti, La Habra Journal
Snapshots: Shopper generate money for Haiti, The Orange County Register
All About Survival, Huntington Beach Independent
Bringing Help to Haiti, Westmont Magazine
The Cupcake Showdown, OC Weekly

Children's charities based in the United States
Charities based in California